Anthony Acid (born Anthony Caputo; April 2, 1965) is an American DJ, producer and remixer. He has worked with the likes of Nast Nova, DJ Skribble, Brutal Bill, and Richie Santana.

Discography

Mixed compilations
Diva Grooves, Vol. 3 (1998)
MDMA, Vol. 1 (1998)
Best of Dance Mix USA, Vol. 2 (1998)
MDMA, Vol. 2 (1999)
MDMA, Vol. 3 (2000)
Reddlite Continuous Mix (2000)
MDMA: Reloaded (2004)

Singles/EPs
"Rock and Boogie Down" (1989)
"Phony Alibis" (1993)
"Gimme Da Music" (1994)
"Powerful" (1996)
"Ha Ha/You Can't Make It" (1996)
"Move" (1996)
"Yes I Do" (1997)
"Muzik Muzik Muzik" (1998)
"Rock the Disco" (1999)
"Infatuation" (2004)
"Sweat" (2005)

Remixography
"Over It" - Tiffany Affair
"Colour of Love" - Amber
"Toi El Moi" - Namie Amuro
"Outta My Head" - A & S Project I
"Special Love" - Bailey & Buzz
"Turn It Out" - Peter Bailey
"Take Me Home Tonight" - Candy Coated Chaos
"Someday" - Charlotte
"You Can Get It" - Critical
"I Want Your Love" - Da Buddah Bangaz
"Love This Way" - Eden's Crush
"All Night Long" - Faith Evans & Puff Daddy
"Not Over Yet" - Grace
"Tush" - Ghostface
"Higher & Higher" - GTS
"Touch It" - Holly James
"Brown Skin" - India.Arie
"More Than Life" - Jana
"I Need Your Love" - Jana
"When I'm With You" - Jinnel
"Angel" - Joée
"Lovestoned" - Justin Timberlake
"I'll House You 1998" - Jungle Brothers
"Feel What You Want" - Kristine W
"Fallin' In Love" - La Bouche
"Find Love" - Layla
"I Still Love You" - Lil Suzy
"Never Leave You (Uh Oooh, Uh Oooh)" - Lumidee
"Chelsea's On Fire (Paris Is Burning)" - Mannequeen
"Day & Nite" - Marcy Faith
"House Muzik" - Moody & Mayday
"Time Waits For No One" - Morel Inc. & Mr. Mike
"Pure Energy" - Nu Agenda
"I'm Not In Love" - Olive
"Outa Here" - Oris Jay
"Ride the Trip" - Plasmic Honey
"Most Girls" - Pink
"Walking" - Pocket Size
"The Chid (Inside)" - Qkumba Zoo
"Gotta Tell You" - Samantha Mumba
"House of Love" - Smooth Touch
"Son of a Preacherman" - Soul S.K.
"Baby" - Syren
"I'm Sprung" - T-Pain
"Pressure" - The Bomb Squad
"Whatever You Like" - T.I. & Dave Navarro
"The Itch" - Vitamin C

References

External links
 Anthony Acid on Myspace
 

1965 births
American DJs
American dance musicians
American house musicians
Record producers from New York (state)
Club DJs
Living people
Nightlife in New York City
Remixers
Electronic dance music DJs